Ahmadabad (also Romanized as Aḩmadābād; also known as Ahmad Abad Arba’eh) is a village in Dehram Rural District, Dehram District, Farashband County, Fars Province, Iran. At the 2006 census, its population was 814, in 176 families.

References 

Populated places in Farashband County